Rodney Ernest Redmond (born 29 December 1944) is a former New Zealand international cricketer. He is the father of Aaron Redmond.

International career
Redmond scored a century and a fifty in his only Test match, against Pakistan in 1972–73, giving him a Test batting average of 81.50. His century included 5 successive fours off a Majid Khan over and came at almost a run-a-ball. He also played two One Day Internationals. He was picked for the 1973 tour of England, but showed little form, having trouble with his contact lenses, and was not chosen for the Tests.

See also
 One Test Wonder

References

External links
 

1944 births
Living people
New Zealand cricketers
New Zealand Test cricketers
Cricketers who made a century on Test debut
Auckland cricketers
Wellington cricketers
New Zealand One Day International cricketers
Cricketers from Whangārei
North Island cricketers